Bell Rock is a very conspicuous and isolated nunatak on Goodenough Glacier, located 12 nautical miles (22 km) east of Mount Ward in Palmer Land. Named by United Kingdom Antarctic Place-Names Committee (UK-APC) for Charles M. Bell, British Antarctic Survey (BAS) geologist at Fossil Bluff, 1968–71.

References

Geography of Antarctica